Tapaz, officially the Municipality of Tapaz (Capiznon/Hiligaynon: Banwa sang Tapaz; Aklanon: Banwa it Tapaz;), is a 1st class municipality in the province of Capiz, Philippines. According to the 2020 census, it has a population of 54,423 people.

The festival in Tapaz are the Patabangay Festival in September honoring Patron Saint Jab, and Sirinadya in January honoring Sr. Santo Niño. Other local festival is Tinuom Festival in San Nicolas celebrated in the Month of December honoring Patron Saint Nicholas of Myra.

The natives of Tapaz are mixture of several ethnic groups as the Malays, Spaniards, Indonesians, and the Aetas or Negritos who are the aborigines of Panay. In the recent years the residents are distincts group as the "Baludnons" those in lowland and "Bukidnons" those in upland.

The town is known for a small community of indigenous Panay-Bukidnon in Barangay Tacayan. The community is home to Feliza, a binukot who has expertise in chanting the suguidanon, one of the most significant epic chants of the Western Visayas region. Feliza is the last known person who can speak the Ligbok language in her community, making her the last bastion for the thousand-year old language in Tapaz. Her death would translate to the death of the language in Tapaz itself and the suguidanon epic chant as well. Also, Feliza has traditional tattoos on her skin which were inscribed when she was chosen as a binukot. In 2016, after reports came out on the dying Ligbok language and suguidanon epic chant, the government began documenting the language and epic chant and teaching the language to younger generations of Panay-Bukidnon in Tapaz.

Marugo lake in San Antonio barangay is most popular tourist destination.

History
The first people who arrived and settled in what is now Tapaz are the Panay-Bukidnon people who speak the indigenous Ligbok language.

When the Spanish arrived in Panay, they established Dumalag town. Eventually, Tapaz was founded in 1835 but it continued being a part of Dumalag town for many years. In 1862 and 1863 two letters were made to declare parish under the patronage of St. Jerome.  Both were signed by Governor General Lemery, but they were never executed.  Finally, in 1874, Tapaz was declared an independent parish by Jaro Bishop Mariano Cuartero.

In 2016, the Ligbok language of the Panay-Bukidnon of Tapaz was confirmed to be dying out. This triggered a massive conservation program for the language and the epic chant spoken by the Panay-Bukidnon.

Geography
Tapaz lies within the latitude 11° 09’ to 11° 09’ 42" and the longitude of 121° 11’ to 122° 34’ 45".

Climate

Barangays
Tapaz is politically subdivided into 58 barangays. Thirty Six (36) lowlands barangays and Twenty Two (22) upland barangays.

Demographics

Religion
As a Catholic Dominant Municipality.  Tapaz has two parishes and three mission stations and many churches.

Parishes:
St. Jerome Parish (Poblacion, Tapaz)
St. Nicholas of Myra Parish (San Nicolas, Tapaz)

Mission Stations:
St. Andre Besette Mission Station (Taft, Tapaz) 
St. Juan Diego Mission Station (Cristina, Tapaz) 
St. Julian of Cuenca Mission Station (San Julian, Tapaz)

Economy

Healthcare
Hospital in Tapaz:
Tapaz District Hospital

Education
The increasing population of school children made the District  of Tapaz into two distincts. The Tapaz East District with 22 complete Elementary Schools and 14 Primary Schools. The Tapaz West District with 19 complete Elementary Schools and 3 Primary Schools. It has 8 Secondary Schools and one University that caters the tertiary education of Tapaznon.

High schools
High Schools in Tapaz:
Bag-ong Barrio National High School
Camburanan National High School
Candelaria National High School
Col. Patrociño Artuz National High School
Rev. Tomas Conejar National High School
Roxas National High School
San Nicolas National High School
Tapaz National High School

College
College in Tapaz:
Capiz State University -Tapaz Campus

References

External links

 [ Philippine Standard Geographic Code]
Philippine Census Information

Municipalities of Capiz
1835 establishments in the Spanish Empire